The Swingin' States is an album by American jazz trombonist Kai Winding featuring performances recorded in 1958 for the Columbia label.

Reception

The Allmusic awarded the album 3 stars and stated "The gimmick of this out-of-print LP by trombonist Kai Winding is that all dozen songs have a state in their title... Winding and fellow trombonist Frank Rehak along with pianist Hank Jones split up all of the solo space on the spirited if somewhat lightweight music".

Track listing
 "Indiana (Back Home Again in Indiana)" (Ballard Macdonald, James F. Hanley) - 2:24
 "Carry Me Back to Old Virginny" (James A. Bland) - 3:01
 "California, Here I Come" (Al Jolson, Buddy De Sylva, Joseph Meyer) - 2:46
 "Louisiana" (Andy Razaf, Bob Schafer, J. C. Johnson) - 2:37
 "Moonlight in Vermont" (Karl Suessdorf, John Blackburn) - 2:42
 "Georgia on My Mind" (Hoagy Carmichael, Stuart Gorrell) - 2:58
 "Jersey Bounce" (Tiny Bradshaw, Eddie Johnson, Bobby Plater, Buddy Feyne) - 2:29
 "Stars Fell on Alabama" (Frank Perkins, Mitchell Parish) - 2:30
 "Idaho" (Jesse Stone) - 3:37
 "At Last Alaska" (Kai Winding) - 3:29
 "Mississippi Mud" (Harry Barris, James Cavanaugh) - 3:21
 "Oklahoma!" (Richard Rodgers, Oscar Hammerstein II) - 2:41
Recorded in New York City on August 22, 1958 (tracks 2, 4, 6 & 7), August 26, 1958 (tracks 1, 3, 5 & 11) and August 29, 1958 (tracks 8-10 & 12).

Personnel
Kai Winding – trombone, arranger
Frank Rehak – trombone
Dick Hixon,  Dick Leib (tracks 1, 3, 5 & 11), Tommy Mitchell (tracks 2, 4, 6-10 & 12) - bass trombone
Hank Jones – piano
Eddie de Haas – bass
Gus Johnson – drums
George Laguna – congas, bongos

References

Columbia Records albums
Kai Winding albums
1958 albums